Every Mother's Worst Fear is a 1998 American made-for-television thriller film starring Cheryl Ladd, Jordan Ladd and Ted McGinley. This film is a cautionary story of cyberspace, kidnapping and the dangers of chat rooms.

Synopsis
Martha Hoagland is a 16-year-old girl suffering through her parents' recent divorce. Her mother is working long hours. Martha has recently been dumped by her high school boyfriend. Feeling lonely and seeking solace, Martha turns to an online chat room. Martha believes she is chatting with a young man who cares for her, when in reality she is chatting with Scanman, an internet predator involved in a cyber-kidnapping ring. Martha, who has told her online chat friend that she is 21, is lured to join her new "friend". When the investigation starts, he claims he never sent her a ticket. The police, the FBI, and an experienced computer hacker help Martha's mother Connie to rescue her 16-year-old daughter from the "Scanman."

Cast
Cheryl Ladd as Connie Hoagland
Jordan Ladd as Martha Hoagland
Robert Wisden as Jeff Hoagland
Tom Butler as Agent Weatherby
Ted McGinley as Scanman
Blu Mankuma as Detective Maris
Treat Williams as Mitch Carson (uncredited)
Chiara Zanni as Sherry
Vincent Gale as Drew Pederson
Brendan Fehr as Alan
Don Thompson as Martin Penny "Skokie"

External links
 
 

1998 television films
1998 films
1998 thriller films
Films about child abduction in the United States
Lifetime (TV network) films
American thriller television films
Films directed by Bill L. Norton
1990s English-language films
1990s American films